A cam engine is a reciprocating engine where, instead of the conventional crankshaft, the pistons deliver their force to a cam that is then caused to rotate. The output work of the engine is driven by this cam.

Cam engines are deeply rooted in history. The first engine to get an airworthiness certificate from the United States government was, in fact, a radial cam engine. A variation of the cam engine, the swashplate engine (also the closely related wobble-plate engine), was briefly popular.

These are generally thought of as internal combustion engines, although they have also been used as hydraulic- and pneumatic motors. Hydraulic motors, particularly the swashplate form, are widely and successfully used. Internal combustion engines, though, remain almost unknown.

Operation

Operating cycle
Some cam engines are two-stroke engines, rather than four-stroke.  Two modern example are the KamTech and Earthstar, both radial-cam engines. In a two-stroke engine, the forces on the piston act uniformly downwards, throughout the cycle. In a four-stroke engine, these forces reverse cyclically: In the induction phase, the piston is forced upwards, against the reduced induction depression. The simple cam mechanism only works with a force in one direction. In the first Michel engines, the cam had two surfaces, a main surface on which the pistons worked when running and another ring inside this that gave a desmodromic action to constrain the piston position during engine startup.

Usually, only one cam is required, even for multiple cylinders. Most cam engines were thus opposed twin or radial engines. An early version of the Michel engine was a rotary engine, a form of radial engine where the cylinders rotate around a fixed crank.

Advantages 
 Perfect balance, a crank system is impossible to dynamically balance, because one cannot attenuate a reciprocal force or action with a rotary reaction or force. The modern KamTech cam engine uses another piston to attenuate the reciprocal forces. It runs as smoothly as an electric motor.
 A more ideal combustion dynamic, a look at a PV diagram of the "ideal IC engine" and one will find that the combustion event ideally should be a more-or-less "constant volume event".

The short dwell time that a crank produces does not provide a more-or-less constant volume for the combustion event to take place in. A crank system reaches significant mechanical advantage at 6° before TDC; it then reaches maximum advantage at 45° to 50°. This limits the burn time to less than 60°. Also, the quickly descending piston lowers the pressure ahead of the flame front, reducing the burn time.  This means less time to burn under lower pressure. This dynamic is why in all crank engines a significant amount of the fuel is burned not above the piston, where its power can be extracted, but in the catalytic converter, which only produces heat.

A modern cam can be manufactured with computer numerical control (CNC) technology so as to have a delayed mechanical advantage. The KamTech cam, for example, reaches significant advantage at 20°, permitting the ignition to start sooner in the rotation, and maximum advantage is moved to 90°, permitting a longer burn time before the exhaust is vented. This means the burn under high pressure takes place during 110° with a cam, rather than 60°, as happens when a crank is used.  Therefore, the KamTech engine at any speed and under any load never has fire coming out of the exhaust, because there is time for full and complete combustion to take place under high pressure above the piston.

A few other advantages of modern cam engines:
 Ideal piston dynamics
 Lower internal friction
 Cleaner exhaust
 Lower fuel consumption
 Longer life
 More power per kilogram
 Compact, modular design permits better vehicle design
 Fewer parts, cost less to make

To suggest that cam engines were or are a failure when robustness is concerned is in error. After extensive testing by the United States government, the Fairchild Model 447-C radial-cam engine had the distinction of receiving the very first Department of Commerce Approved Type Certificate.  At a time when aircraft crank engine had a life of 30 to 50 hours, the Model 447-C was far more robust than any other aircraft engine then in production.
Sadly, in this pre-CNC age it had a very poor cam profile, which meant it shook too severely for the wood propellers and the wood, wire, and cloth airframes of the time.

Bearing area 
One advantage is that the bearing surface area can be larger than for a crankshaft. In the early days of bearing material development, the reduced bearing pressure this allowed could give better reliability. A relatively successful swashplate cam engine was developed by the bearing expert George Michell, who also developed the slipper-pad thrust block.

The Michel engine (no relation) began with roller cam followers, but switched during development to plain bearing followers.

Effective gearing 
Unlike a crankshaft, a cam may easily have more than one throw per rotation. This allows more than one piston stroke per revolution. For aircraft use, this was an alternative to using a propeller speed reduction unit: high engine speed for an improved power-to-weight ratio, combined with a slower propeller speed for an efficient propeller. In practice, the cam engine design weighed more than the combination of a conventional engine and gearbox.

Swashplate and wobble plate engines  
The only internal combustion cam engines that have been remotely successful were the swashplate engines. These were almost all axial engines, where the cylinders are arranged parallel to the engine axis, in one or two rings. The purpose of such engines was usually to achieve this axial or "barrel" layout, making an engine with a very compact frontal area. There were plans at one time to use barrel engines as aircraft engines, with their reduced frontal area allowing a smaller fuselage and lower drag.

A similar engine to the swashplate engine is the wobble plate engine, also known as nutator or Z-crank drive. This uses a bearing that purely nutates, rather than also rotating as for the swashplate. The wobble plate is separated from the output shaft by a rotary bearing. Wobble plate engines are thus not cam engines.

Pistonless rotary engines 
Some engines use cams, but are not "cam engines" in the sense described here. These are a form of pistonless rotary engine. Since the time of James Watt, inventors have sought a rotary engine that relied on purely rotating movement, without the reciprocating movement and balance problems of the piston engine. These engines don't work either.

Most pistonless engines relying on cams, such as the Rand cam engine, use the cam mechanism to control the motion of sealing vanes. Combustion pressure against these vanes causes a vane carrier, separate from the cam, to rotate. In the Rand engine, the camshaft moves the vanes so that they have a varying length exposed and so enclose a combustion chamber of varying volume as the engine rotates. The work done in rotating the engine to cause this expansion is the thermodynamic work done by the engine and what causes the engine to rotate.

Notes

References

Bibliography

Two-stroke engines
Piston engine configurations
Axial engines